Nyctopais is a genus of longhorn beetles of the subfamily Lamiinae, containing the following species:

 Nyctopais burgeoni Breuning, 1934
 Nyctopais jordani Aurivillius, 1913
 Nyctopais mysteriosus Thomson, 1858
 Nyctopais mysticus Jordan, 1894

References

Tragocephalini
Cerambycidae genera